Parviz Badpa (born 14 August 1954) is an Iranian boxer. He competed in the men's heavyweight event at the 1976 Summer Olympics. At the 1976 Summer Olympics, he lost to Clarence Hill of Bermuda.

References

External links
 

1954 births
Living people
Iranian male boxers
Olympic boxers of Iran
Boxers at the 1976 Summer Olympics
Place of birth missing (living people)
Heavyweight boxers